Noujaim is a Lebanese Maronite Christian last name meaning "small star". Notable people with the surname include:

 Fares D. Noujaim, Lebanese-American investment banker
 Guy-Paul Noujaim, (born 1935), Lebanese Maronite Catholic eparch and Emeritus Auxiliary Bishop
 Jehane Noujaim, (born c. 1980), Egyptian-American documentary film director of Lebanese origin
 Selim Noujaim, American politician, member of the Connecticut House of Representatives